

Georg von Neufville (27 October 1883 – 3 November 1941) was an SA and Nazi functionary who served as an officer in the Wehrmacht during World War II. He was a recipient of the Knight's Cross of the Iron Cross. Neufville was wounded during the Battle of Moscow and died in a field hospital. He was posthumously promoted to Generalmajor.

Awards and decorations

 Knight's Cross of the Iron Cross on 22 September 1941 as Oberst zur Verwendung and commander of Infanterie-Regiment 195

References

Citations

Bibliography

 

1883 births
1941 deaths
Military personnel from Frankfurt
Major generals of the German Army (Wehrmacht)
Sturmabteilung officers
German Army personnel of World War I
20th-century Freikorps personnel
Prussian Army personnel
German Army personnel killed in World War II
Recipients of the clasp to the Iron Cross, 1st class
Recipients of the Knight's Cross of the Iron Cross
People from Hesse-Nassau